S. Nagoor Meeran (died 27 August 2018) was an Indian politician and former Member of the Legislative Assembly. He was elected to the Tamil Nadu legislative assembly as an Anna Dravida Munnetra Kazhagam candidate from Kadayanallur constituency in 1991 election.

References 

Year of birth missing
20th-century births
2018 deaths
All India Anna Dravida Munnetra Kazhagam politicians
Tamil Nadu MLAs 1991–1996
People from Tirunelveli district